Laura de Noves (1310–1348) was the wife of Count Hugues de Sade (ancestor of the Marquis de Sade). 

She could be the Laura that the Humanist poet Francesco Petrarch wrote about extensively; however, she has never been positively identified as such. Laura had a great influence on Petrarch's life and lyrics. The historical information on Laura is meager at best.

Born six years after Petrarch in 1310 in Avignon, she was the daughter of a knight, Audibert de Noves, and his wife, Ermessenda. She married at the age of 15 on 16 January 1325. Not much is known about her other than she did have a large family, was a virtuous wife, and died in 1348. 

Petrarch saw her for the first time on 6 April (Good Friday) in 1327 at Easter mass in the church of Sainte-Claire d'Avignon. Since this first encounter with Laura, Petrarch spent the next three years in Avignon singing his romantic love and stalking Laura in church and on her walks, even purchasing a small estate in 1337 at Vaucluse to be near her. There is no evidence to suggest that Laura and Petrarch had a relationship, or that they were even acquaintances. At this estate, for the next three years, he wrote numerous sonnets in her praise. Petrarch's Canzoniere (Songbook) is the lyrics to her in the troubadour tradition of courtly love. They advanced the growth of Italian as a literary language. They also popularized this form of sonnet that is called Petrarchan sonnet. Years after her death Petrarch wrote his Trionfi, which is a religious allegory in which Laura is idealized.

By the time she died of the plague on April 6, 1348, she had given birth to 11 children.

References

External links
 

1310 births
1348 deaths
14th-century French people
Petrarch
14th-century French women
Muses